The National Hockey League (NHL) is a major professional ice hockey league which operates in Canada and the United States. Since its inception in 1917–18, 53 players born within the current borders of the United Kingdom have taken part. None of them, however, were trained within the country. Of these players, 23 are from England, 21 from Scotland, 5 from Northern Ireland and 4 from Wales. Steve Thomas and Owen Nolan played over 1,000 regular season games, while Thomas and Steve Smith are the only ones to have appeared in over 100 playoff games. All three players finished their careers in the 21st century. The only player born in the UK currently playing in the NHL is Nathan Walker of the St. Louis Blues.

The modern form of ice hockey is generally considered to have begun in the mid-19th century. One of the first games to use a puck was played by a group of Englishmen from the Royal Canadian Rifle Regiment in Kingston, Ontario. In the United Kingdom, a five team league was established in 1903, while Great Britain was one of the founding members of the International Ice Hockey Federation five years later. The game was first administrated by the British Ice Hockey Association, from 1914 until 1999, when Ice Hockey UK took over. In the early part of the 20th century the Great Britain national team enjoyed some success: they won gold at the 1936 Olympics, improving on their result of bronze twelve years earlier; won medals at three World Championships (bronze in 1935, and silver in 1937 and 1938), and won the first European Championships in 1910. The British team's heavy reliance on Canadian-trained players during its 1936 Olympic run was especially controversial, and prompted a protest from Canadian hockey officials.

Two players born in the United Kingdom participated in the first season of the NHL. Ken Thompson had played the previous season for the Montreal Wanderers in the National Hockey Association (NHA), and played one game in the NHL before the Wanderers disbanded shortly after their home rink burnt down. Joe Hall had also played in the NHA prior to the NHL: he spent eight years playing for the Montreal Shamrocks and the Quebec Bulldogs, and won the Stanley Cup twice with the latter side. He joined the Montreal Canadiens for the first season of the NHL. Hall competed in the 1919 Stanley Cup Finals which were cancelled when most of his league champion Canadiens contracted Spanish influenza, and Hall died from flu-induced pneumonia shortly after. In 1961, he became the second player born in the United Kingdom to have been inducted into the Hockey Hall of Fame.

The first Hall of Famer born in the UK was Charlie Gardiner, inducted in 1945. Described as "one of the game's preeminent goaltenders during the 1920s and 1930s," he played seven seasons in the NHL with the Chicago Black Hawks. He won the Vezina Trophy on two occasions, and was named team captain for the 1933–34 season, leading his team to win their first Stanley Cup. It was the only time a goaltender had captained a Cup-winning side. Just over two months after the Stanley Cup victory, Gardiner died of a brain hemorrhage.

Players

Key
 Pos – Position, G (Goaltender), D (Defenceman), LW (Left Wing), C (Centre), RW (Right Wing)
 RS – Number of regular season games played in the NHL
 PO – Number of playoff games played in the NHL
  – Player has been inducted into the Hockey Hall of Fame

See also
 Elite Ice Hockey League

Notes

References
General
 

Specific

NHL
National Hockey League players